The Kids from 47A is a British children's television series produced by Associated Television. Three series were made; the first (comprising 15 episodes) was shown in 1973, the second (13 episodes) and third (13 episodes) in 1974. The third series ends with Jess (Christine McKenna) getting married. A one-off episode (promoted as a comedy and entitled "Home Sweet Home") was broadcast on 31 August 1975.

Plot
The series is about four children whose widowed mother is taken into hospital, leaving them to cope on their own. The eldest—office worker Jess Gathercole—becomes the family matriarch, making every effort to keep her schoolchild sister and brothers at home with her.

At the start of the second series, the Gathercole mother has died and Jess is only able to keep the family together after battling with social services, who continue to keep a watchful eye.

Cast
Jess was played by Christine McKenna, her bookish sister Binny by Gaynor Hodgson and her brothers—football-mad Willy and primary schoolboy George—by Nigel Greaves and Russell Lewis, respectively. Other parts were played by Lloyd Lamble (as Jess' employer) and Joan Newell.

Christine McKenna would later star in the TV adaptation of Flambards and is now a television producer in the US, while Russell Lewis went on to become a successful screenwriter. Nigel Greaves has had roles in Tenko and Kenneth Branagh's cinema adaptation of Shakespeare's Henry V.

Production
Writers for the series included Lynda La Plante, Gail Renard and Phil Redmond. The directors were Alan Coleman, Richard Bramall and Jonathan Wright-Miller. Script editor Philip Hinchcliffe went on to become the producer of Doctor Who for the BBC from 1974 to 1977.

External links
 

1970s British children's television series
1973 British television series debuts
1974 British television series endings
ITV children's television shows
English-language television shows
Television shows produced by Associated Television (ATV)